Rafail Koumentakis (born ) is a Greek male volleyball player. He is part of the Greece men's national volleyball team. On club level he plays for Olympiacos Piraeus.

Honours

Club
 2022–23  CEV Challenge Cup, with Olympiacos Piraeus
National Championships
 2017/2018  Greek League Cup, with PAOK Thessaloniki
 2018/2019  Greek League Cup, with Olympiacos Piraeus
 2018/2019  Greek Championship, with Olympiacos Piraeus
 2021/2022  Greek Cup, with PAOK Thessaloniki

Individually
2018  Greek Cup – Most Valuable Player
2022 Greek Cup – Most Valuable Player

References

External links
 profile at FIVB.org

1993 births
Living people
Greek men's volleyball players
Olympiacos S.C. players
Sportspeople from Alexandroupolis